Poritia phama is a small butterfly found in the Indomalayan realm that belongs to the lycaenids or blues family. The species was first described by Hamilton Herbert Druce in 1895.

Subspecies
 P. p. phama Borneo, Sumatra, Java
P. p. geta Fawcett, 1897 Pakistan, Assam - Myanmar, Thailand
P. p. courvoisieri Fruhstorfer, 1917 East Java
P. p. regia Evans, 1921 Langkawi Island, South Thailand
P. p. rajata Corbet, 1940
P. p. palawana Osada, 1994 Philippines, Palawan, Olanguan

References

Poritia
Fauna of Pakistan
Butterflies of Asia
Butterflies described in 1895